The World Championship is an annual competition and the premier championship for BriSCA Formula 2 Stock Cars. The winner is granted the honour of racing with a gold roof and wing until the next World Final.

Qualification
The World Final is usually held in September. The host tracks, all of which are based in Britain, are chosen by the designated promoter.

The grid for the World Final is composed of drivers from Britain who are chosen through a series of qualifying rounds and two World Championship Semi-Finals. Drivers who fail to progress from the World Semi-Finals may race again in a Consolation Semi-Final to choose two more entrants, and the reigning World Champion is entitled to start at the rear of the grid if they have not already qualified. The British drivers are joined by stock car drivers from the Netherlands, Northern Ireland and the Isle of Man.

The most successful driver in World Final races is Rob Speak, who has won eight. Other notable multiple winners include Bill Batten (four), Dave Brown (three) and Gordon Moodie (three).

List of winners
All drivers are British, except where marked.

References

External links
 Official BriSCA F2 website

Stock car racing in the United Kingdom
Stock car racing series
Auto racing series in the United Kingdom
Motorsport competitions in the United Kingdom